Chrysops hirsuticallus is a species of deer fly in the family Tabanidae.

Distribution
United States.

References

Tabanidae
Insects described in 1941
Taxa named by Cornelius Becker Philip
Diptera of North America